William Whitney Rice (March 7, 1826 – March 1, 1896) was a U.S. Representative from Massachusetts.

Born in Deerfield, Massachusetts, Rice attended Gorham Academy, Maine, and graduated from Bowdoin College in Brunswick, Maine, in 1846. He served as the preceptor of Leicester Academy, Leicester, Massachusetts from 1847 to 1851 before studying law in Worcester. He was admitted to the bar in 1854 and commenced practice in Worcester. In 1858 he was appointed judge of insolvency for Worcester County.

Rice was elected mayor of the city of Worcester in December 1859. He served as district attorney for the middle district of Massachusetts from 1869 to 1874 and was a member of the State house of representatives in 1875.

Rice was elected a member of the American Antiquarian Society in 1885.

Rice was elected as a Republican to the Forty-fifth and to the four succeeding Congresses (March 4, 1877 – March 3, 1887). After a failed re-election bid in 1886, he returned to Worcester and resumed the practice of law. He died there on March 1, 1896, at age 69, and was interred at Worcester Rural Cemetery.

Rice family and relations
William was a direct descendant of Edmund Rice, an English immigrant to Massachusetts Bay Colony. He married Alice Miller (1840–1900), whose mother Nancy Merrick Miller was sister to Massachusetts judge  Pliny T. Merrick. Alice's own sister, Ruth Ann Miller, married U.S. Senator George Frisbie Hoar, making Rice and Hoar brothers-in-law. Alice founded a children's day nursery in Worcester.

See also
 1875 Massachusetts legislature

References 

William Whiitney Rice. New York Times obituary March 2, 1896.
Hoar, Rockwood:  William Whitney Rice A Biographical Sketch (1897).

Notes

External links 
 
 

1826 births
1896 deaths
Mayors of Worcester, Massachusetts
Bowdoin College alumni
Republican Party members of the Massachusetts House of Representatives
District attorneys in Worcester County, Massachusetts
Massachusetts Free Soilers
Republican Party members of the United States House of Representatives from Massachusetts
Burials at Rural Cemetery (Worcester, Massachusetts)
People from Deerfield, Massachusetts
19th-century American politicians
Members of the American Antiquarian Society